Christopher I served as Greek Patriarch of Alexandria between 817 and 841.

References

8th-century births
9th-century deaths
9th-century Patriarchs of Alexandria
9th-century writers